Vologda Viceroyalty was an administrative division (a namestnichestvo) of the Russian Empire, which existed in 1780–1796. The seat of the Viceroyalty was located in Vologda.

It was subdivided into three oblasts: Vologda, Veliky Ustyug, and Arkhangelsk. The predecessor of Vologda Viceroyalty was Archangelgorod Governorate with the seat in Arkhangelsk.

As with most of other governorates and viceroyalties established in the 1770s–1780s, the establishment of Vologda Viceroyalty was a part of the reform attempting to have a tighter control of local matters by the Russian autocracy.  The reform, in turn, was facilitated by the Pugachev's Rebellion of 1774–1775.

On March 26, 1784 Arkhangelsk Oblast was split off and established as Arkhangelsk Viceroyalty.

Between 1784 and 1796, Vologda Viceroyalty bordered Arkhangelsk Viceroyalty in the north, Tobolsk Viceroyalty in the northeast, Perm Viceroyalty in the east, Vyatka Viceroyalty in the southeast, Kostroma and Yaroslavl Viceroyalties in the south, Novgorod Viceroyalty in the southwest, and Olonets Viceroyalty in the west. In terms of the modern political division of Russia, Vologda Viceroyalty in this period comprised the areas of what is currently the greater part of Vologda Oblast, as well as parts of the Komi Republic, Kostroma, Kirov, and Nizhny Novgorod Oblasts.

On the territory of the viceroyalty (Vologda and Veliky Ustyug Oblasts) Vologda Governorate was established.

Governors
The administration of the viceroyalty was performed by a namestnik (vice-roy) and controlled by a governor general. The governors of Vologda Viceroyalty were
 1780-1788 Alexey Petrovich Melgunov;
 1788-1793 Evgeniy Petrovich Kashkin;
 1794-1796 Pyotr Vasilyevich Lopukhin.

The namestniks were
 1780-1784 Grigoriy Dmitriyevich Makarov;
 1784-1792 Pyotr Fyodorovich Mezentsov;
 1793-1796 Nikolay Dmitriyevich Shetnev.

References

States and territories established in 1780
1796 disestablishments
Viceroyalties of the Russian Empire
1780 establishments in the Russian Empire